Judge Pitman or Pittman may refer to:

C.M. Pitman (1872–1948), British Judge Advocate of the Fleet and Referee of the Supreme Court of Judicature
Craig Sorrell Pittman (born 1956), judge of the Alabama Court of Civil Appeals
Elizabeth Pittman (1921–1998), municipal court judge in Omaha, Nebraska, and the first woman judge and the first black judge in Nebraska
John Pitman (judge) (1785–1864), judge of the United States District Court for the District of Rhode Island
Jonathan Pittman (born 1963), associate judge of the Superior Court of the District of Columbia
Mark T. Pittman (born 1975), judge of the United States District Court for the Northern District of Texas
Robert Carter Pitman (1825–1891), judge of the Massachusetts Superior Court
Robert L. Pitman (born 1962), judge of the United States District Court for the Western District of Texas
Thomas Virgil Pittman (1916–2012), judge of the United States District Courts for the Middle District and Southern Districts of Alabama

See also
Edwin L. Pittman (born 1935), justice of the Supreme Court of Mississippi